Marianela  is a 1955 Argentine drama film directed by Julio Porter, and starring Olga Zubarry and José María Gutiérrez. It is based on the 1878 novel by Benito Pérez Galdós. Zubarry won the Silver Condor Award for Best Actress at the 1956 Argentine Association of Film Critics Awards for her performance as the title character.

Cast
Olga Zubarry as Marianela
José María Gutiérrez as Pablo
Pedro Laxalt  		
Domingo Sapelli 			
Juan Sarcione 			
Perla Alvarado 		
Julio Esbrez 			
Marisa Núñez
Nora Egle Salemme

References

External links
 

1955 films
1950s Spanish-language films
Argentine black-and-white films
Films based on works by Benito Pérez Galdós
Films directed by Julio Porter
1955 drama films
Argentine drama films
1950s Argentine films